A Twinkie is an American snack cake, described as "golden sponge cake with a creamy filling". It was formerly made and distributed by Hostess Brands. The brand is currently owned by Hostess Brands, Inc., having been formerly owned by private equity firms Apollo Global Management and C. Dean Metropoulos and Company as the second incarnation of Hostess Brands. During bankruptcy proceedings, Twinkie production was suspended on November 15, 2012, and resumed after an absence of a few months from American store shelves, becoming available again nationwide on July 15, 2013.

Grupo Bimbo's Vachon Inc., which owns the Canadian rights to the product and made them during their absence from the U.S. market, produces Twinkies in Canada at a bakery in Montreal. They are made in Emporia, Kansas, in the U.S. Twinkies are also available in Mexican stores as "Submarinos" made by Marinela, and as "Tuinky" made by Wonder; both Marinela and Wonder are also subsidiaries of Mexican bread company Grupo Bimbo. In Egypt, Twinkies are produced under the company Edita. Twinkies are also available in the United Kingdom and Ireland under the Hostess brand name where they are sold in Sainsburys, Tesco, ASDA, and B&M stores. Twinkies are produced and distributed by multiple commercial bakeries in China, where Hostess does not own the brand.

History

Twinkies were invented on April 6, 1930, by Canadian-born baker James Alexander Dewar for the Continental Baking Company in Schiller Park, Illinois,. Realizing that several machines used for making cream-filled strawberry shortcake sat idle when strawberries were out of season, Dewar conceived a snack cake filled with banana cream, which he dubbed the Twinkie. Ritchy Koph said he came up with the name when he saw a billboard in St. Louis for "Twinkle Toe Shoes".

During World War II, bananas were rationed, and the company was forced to switch to vanilla cream. This change proved popular, and banana-cream Twinkies were not widely re-introduced. The original flavor was occasionally found in limited time only promotions, but the company used vanilla cream for most Twinkies. In 1988, Fruit and Cream Twinkies were introduced with a strawberry filling swirled into the cream. The product was soon dropped. Vanilla's dominance over banana flavoring was challenged in 2005, following a month-long promotion of the movie King Kong. Hostess saw its Twinkie sales rise 20 percent during the promotion, and in 2007 restored the banana-cream Twinkie to its snack lineup although they are now made with 2% banana purée.

In November 2012, as Hostess announced its plan to shut down its operations, Time ranked the Twinkie #1 in its list of 10 "iconic" junk foods, claiming that "they've been a staple in our popular culture and, above all, in our hearts. Often criticized for its lack of any nutritional value whatsoever, the Twinkie has managed to persevere as a cultural and gastronomical icon."

Hostess bankruptcy
On January 11, 2012, parent company Hostess filed for Chapter 11 bankruptcy protection. Twinkie sales for the year, were 36 million packages, down almost 20% from a year earlier. Hostess said customers had migrated to healthier foods. On November 16, 2012, Hostess officially announced that it "will be winding down operations and has filed a motion with the U.S. Bankruptcy Court seeking permission to close its business and sell its assets, including its iconic brands and facilities." Bakery operations were suspended at all plants.

On November 19, 2012, Hostess and the Bakers Union agreed to mediation, delaying the shutdown for two days. On November 21, 2012, U.S. bankruptcy judge Robert Drain approved Hostess' request to shut down, ending Twinkie production in the United States.

Return of Twinkies to U.S. market

On March 18, 2013, it was reported that Twinkies would return to store shelves in May of that year. Twinkies, along with other Hostess Brands, were purchased out of bankruptcy by Apollo Global Management and Metropoulos & Co for $410 million.
Twinkies returned to U.S. shelves on July 15, 2013. Apollo subsequently sold Hostess for $2.3 billion.

Before Hostess Brands filed for bankruptcy, Twinkies were reduced in size. They now contain  and have a mass of 38.5 grams, while the original Twinkies contained  and had a mass of 42.5 grams. The new Twinkies also have a longer shelf life of 45 days, which was also a change made before bankruptcy, compared to the 26 days of the original Twinkies.

Twinkies Cereal, made by Post, was introduced in December 2020.

Deep-fried Twinkie

Deep frying a Twinkie involves freezing the cake, dipping it into batter, and deep-frying it. A story in The New York Times about the deep fried Twinkie with one of its claimed inventors — Christopher Sell, originally from Rugby, England — described this way: "Something magical occurs when the pastry hits the hot oil. The creamy white vegetable shortening filling liquefies, impregnating the sponge cake with its luscious vanilla flavor.... The cake itself softens and warms, nearly melting, contrasting with the crisp, deep-fried crust in a buttery and suave way. The pièce de résistance, however, is a ruby-hued berry sauce, adding a tart sophistication to all that airy sugary goodness."

In 2002, Brooklyn restaurateur Clint Mullen introduced the fried Twinkie at several state and county fairs to great popular acclaim, and the notion spread to other establishments that specialize in fried foods. Fried Twinkies are sold throughout the U.S. in fairs as well as ball games, and in various restaurants. Starting in August 2016, Walmart began selling prepackaged, frozen versions of the deep-fried Twinkie at stores nationwide in the US.

Cultural references

Television and film
 In 1984, the Twinkie became known worldwide in countries that did not sell the confection, due to a reference in the hit film Ghostbusters. In the film, the character Egon Spengler describes a speculated level of psychokinetic energy and uses a regular-sized Twinkie to represent the normal level of such energy in New York City.
 In the 1978 film The Deer Hunter, two hunters enjoy lunch while one dips a Twinkie in mustard.
 In the 1979 film, The Jerk, protagonist Navin is served his favorite meal for his 21st birthday: tuna fish salad on white bread with mayonnaise and a couple of Twinkies. When Navin leaves his party in a tiff, his mom comforts him privately with another Twinkie.
 The 1988 action film Die Hard makes light of Twinkie ingredients in an exchange between characters John McClane (played by Bruce Willis) and Sgt. Al Powell (Reginald VelJohnson). In the sequel, Die Hard 2, Twinkies appear in the desk of Sgt. Al Powell.
 In the 1989 film UHF, "Weird Al" Yankovic makes a Twinkie wiener sandwich, composed of a hotdog topped with Easy Cheese in a bun made from a Twinkie.
 In the 1990 film Gremlins 2: The New Batch, Billy is eating Twinkies with a gremlin.
 In 1993 film Benny & Joon, Sam grabs two Twinkies from the counter and uses them as dance shoes in the diner.
 In 1994 film Richie Rich, Twinkies make a cameo.
 In the TV sitcom Seinfeld (1994 episode "The Big Salad"), Jerry refers to Newman as being a mystery wrapped up in a Twinkie. 
 The Simpsons episode "Homer and Apu" (Season 5 Episode 13, 1994) has an irate customer attempt to take his overcharged rage out on Twinkies at the Kwik-E-Mart. Apu scoffs at the futile effort to destroy the cellophaned treat.
 Family Guy episode "Da Boom" (Season 2 Episode 3) originally aired December 26, 1999, a year that fizzled into anticlimactic, unrealised fears for us, but the Griffins saw in a catastrophic Y2K. Peter, Lois, Meg, Chris, Stewie and Brian, survive a nuclear holocaust to be left in a world without food. Their only salvation from starvation may be at a 'Twinkee' factory. 
 In the 1999 Warner Bros. film The Iron Giant, Turbo Twinkie is a late night snack concoction briefly consumed by Hogarth Hughes. The item consists of a Twinkies Snack Cake injected with a core filling of whipped cream.
 In the 2000 film Next Friday, Craig and Daymond discuss a relationship of Daymond’s ex only for Twinkies to be mentioned during there conversation on a restraining order.
 In 2001's Lady and the Tramp II: Scamp's Adventure, Twinkie wrappers can be spotted at the dump.
 In 2001's Gilmore Girls, Lorelai, Rory, Richard, Emily and Dean are offered home-made Twinkies at a Friday night dinner; later that evening Lorelai serves a whole plate of Twinkies at home in Stars Hollow.
 In 2003's Terminator 3: Rise of the Machines, the T-850 Terminator is going shopping to grab Twinkies as part of food supplies.
 In 2005 film, Madagascar, a box in the background of Twinkies is seen on the table of Marty’s birthday.
 In the 2006 film Click, Michael Newman gets involved to becoming overweight and argues with his son, seconds later he runs off with the box of Twinkies.
In 2007's movie Disturbia, Kale Bracht builds a tower of Twinkies in his house.
 In 2008's 21, Miles is laying on the couch eating Twinkies.
 The Twinkie has cameo in the Disney Pixar film WALL-E (2008) in which, in the far future, WALL-E keeps his collections on a shelf. Eventually, Hal the cockroach sleeps in the Twinkie.
 In the 2009's Knowing, Twinkies are gone and burned away by the Sun's solar flare even though they make slight cameo at a gas station.
 The plot of the 2009 film Zombieland (also featuring Bill Murray) is partly driven by a tireless search for America's last Hostess Twinkie. Woody Harrelson's character, "Tallahassee", mentions Twinkies' reputation for longevity.
 In 2009's documentary television series episode "The Last Supper", in Life After People, Twinkies are described to be made of sorbic acid in which case may last longer for 25 years or more making them indestructible. 
 The 2011 anti-hero film Ghost Rider: Spirit of Vengeance makes light of the popular misconception that Twinkies will not become stale or deteriorate. The film's antagonist, who has the power of decay, grabs items of food, only to see it decay in his hand; when he grabs the Twinkie, it does not change.
 Twinkleton makes a cameo appearance in the 2012 film Foodfight!.
 In 2012's Madagascar 3: Europe's Most Wanted, between the conversation of Alex and Gia is a red box of Twinkies behind her makeup on the top shelf.
 In X-Men: Apocalypse, Quicksilver eats a Twinkie while in slow motion of his run at the same time saving mutants.
 In the 2017 movie Justice League, a box of Twinkies can be notice between The Flash and Batman.
 In Spider-Man: Into the Spider-Verse, a snack of a twinkle is sitting on Miles' top shelf in his room.
 A scene in the 2018 film adaptation of Mortal Engines has two characters eating something called an "...Inkie"; despite probably being over a thousand years old, it was still edible.
 In 2019's We Summon the Darkness, a box of Twinkies hits the girls' car window on their way to a party.
 In 2019's Lupin III: The First, Laetitia inside of a big boat crate with Lupin finds Twinkie cookies in a little box.
 In StarDog and TurboCat, Buddy and Felix hide in a store from security guards in a mountain full of Twinkie Cereal.
 In 2019's The Orville, The road not taken, a Twinkie is the first item Gordon Malloy creates using a stolen food replicator. 
 In the 2020 television series The Owl House, Amity brings a Twinkie-like cupcake to Luz with Life Fairies inside, only for Luz to be disgusted. Amity mentions that "the ingredients are very fresh".
 In Eternals, Druig is holding a box of Twinkies.
 A scene in 2021's television series Star Trek: Prodigy, a box of Twinkies was in the USS Protostar'''s cafeteria.
 In the 2021 film Ghostbusters Afterlife, Twinkies can be spotted inside the barn.
 In 2021 film, Thunder Force, a box of Twinkies can be spotted in the diner. 
 In the 2021 TV series Station Eleven, two survivors pack a ton of food in two carts; one of the packages are Twinkies.
 In Samurai Rabbit: The Usagi Chronicles, Twinkies can be spotted in the food stand of the desert menu in Downtown Tokyo in the background.
 In 2022's Halo, Master Chief’s friend Soren hands him a small dessert sample of a Twinkie. In response, Master Chief replies that it “Doesn’t taste anything,” to which Soren replies, “It's freedom”.

Video games
In 2014's Watch Dogs, A restaurant named Quinkies is similar to the name of Twinkies. Twinkies also make a cameo as a Twinkie Donut.
In 2015's Call of Duty Black Ops III, Hendricks is seen with the player eating a Twinkie on the VTOL.
In 2018's Spider-Man, Feast provides a big sponge cake for Aunt May in her time of service.

Song lyrics
 Twinkies are one of various products mentioned in "Junk Food Junkie", a Top 40 1976 novelty song by Larry Groce.
 John Fogerty's 2004 album Deja Vu All Over Again includes the satirical, somewhat world-weary song "Nobody's Here Anymore", which ponders people's infatuation with modern technology and its ever more sophisticated consumer devices. "He got a stash of Twinkies up in his room" is a line lamenting the self-absorption and social isolation of the protagonist of the song's first verse.
 "Habits (Stay High)", a 2013 song by Swedish singer Tove Lo, mentions Twinkies in the line "I get home, I got the munchies / Binge on all my Twinkies / Throw up in the tub / Then I go to sleep." In an interview, the singer confessed she had thought that "twinkie" was a synonym for "cookie" and that Hostess had sent her a sample of the product after the success of the song.

Twinkie defense

"Twinkie defense" is a derisive label for an improbable legal defense. It is not a recognized legal defense in jurisprudence, but a catch-all term coined by reporters during their coverage of the trial of defendant Dan White for the murders of San Francisco city Supervisor Harvey Milk and Mayor George Moscone. White's defense was that he suffered diminished capacity as a result of his depression. His change in diet from healthful food to Twinkies and other sugary foods was said to be a symptom of depression. Contrary to common belief, White's attorneys did not argue that the Twinkies were the cause of White's actions, but that their consumption was symptomatic of his underlying depression.

Theological Twinkie
Jeffrey R. Holland, a member of the Quorum of the Twelve Apostles of the Church of Jesus Christ of Latter-day Saints (LDS Church), used the expression "theological Twinkie" at the Church's General Conference in April 1998, in reference to teaching methods that may be pleasing or entertaining, but lack sufficient spiritual and doctrinal substance. In his words: "Are we really nurturing our youth and our new members in a way that will sustain them when the stresses of life appear? Or are we giving them a kind of theological Twinkie—spiritually empty calories?" 

Shelf life
A common urban legend claims that Twinkies have an infinite shelf life, and can last unspoiled for a relatively long time of ten, fifty, or one hundred years due to the chemicals used in their production.

The 2012 Super Bowl Chevy Silverado Apocalypse commercial also gives a nod to the Twinkie's reputed durability.

In reality, Twinkies are on the shelf for a short time; a company executive told The New York Times'' in 2000 that the "Twinkie is on the shelf no more than 7 to 10 days."

The maximum shelf life was reported to have been 26 days, until the addition of stronger preservatives made beginning in 2012 increased it to 45 days. A box of Twinkies from shortly before Hostess's bankruptcy in 2012 was opened eight years later; one had completely molded over with cladosporium, another had a small amount of mold, and the creme filling in a third Twinkie had turned brown with the taste of "old sock".

Twinkie diet
In 2010, Kansas State University professor Mark Haub went on a "convenience store" diet consisting mainly of a snack of Twinkies, Oreos, or Doritos every 3 hours in an attempt to demonstrate to his students "...that in weight loss, pure calorie counting is what matters most, not the nutritional value of the food." He lost  over a two-month period, returning his body mass index (BMI) to within normal range.

In addition to Twinkies, Haub ate Little Debbie snack cakes, cereals, cookies, brownies, Doritos, Oreos and other kinds of high calorie, low-nutrition foods that are usually found at convenience stores. However, despite calling it the "Twinkie diet", Haub also consumed 1 protein shake per day and one serving of canned green beans or 4 celery stalks, along with the Twinkies, Oreos, and Doritos. Besides the protein shake and multivitamin, Haub also ate nutritionally dense whole milk, carrots, and vitamin fortified cereal. This contradicts representations by other media outlets stating that Haub "only" ate junk food. He ate the vegetables at the dinner table in order to set a good example for his children.

See also

 Banana bread
 Chocodile Twinkie
 Deep-fried Mars bar
 Ding Dong
 Ho Hos
 Ladyfinger (biscuit)
 List of deep fried foods
 Mars bar
 Sno Balls
 Twinkie the Kid
 Zingers

References

Further reading

External links

 Products Page on Hostess' website 
 Products Page on Crumbs Carnival Treats website 
 The T.W.I.N.K.I.E.S. Project
 Twinkies at 75: munch 'em, fry 'em, save 'em for years, The Christian Science Monitor
 Weird Al Yankovic making a Twinkie wiener sandwich at YouTube

Brand name snack foods
Deep fried foods
Hostess Brands brands
Products introduced in 1930
American snack foods
Stuffed desserts